Norbert Kraft (born 21 August 1950) is a Canadian guitarist, music teacher, producer and arranger.

Life
Born in Linz, Austria, Kraft's family emigrated to Canada in 1954. He studied at the Royal Conservatory of Music at Toronto with Carl van Feggelen and later with John Mills and Aaron Shearer.

An international performer, Kraft has also recorded and (together with his wife Bonnie Silver, who is also a pianist and harpsichordist) produced many albums on the Naxos Records label. In 1994, he launched the label's Guitar Collection as producer and artistic director.

Kraft specializes in solo guitar pieces from the 17th to 20th centuries as well as concerto repertoire. He has published many arrangements and transcriptions of baroque and later solo and chamber music, including works for guitar and harpsichord. He has compiled and edited a series of graded technical exercises and repertoire for the guitar. These were published in 1978 as "Classical Guitar Editions" and were adopted as official curriculum by the Royal Conservatory of Music (Toronto). He is also a composer for classical guitar.

He has served on the faculties of Manhattan School of Music, University of Toronto and the Royal Conservatory of Music.

Awards
Grand Prize in the 1975 Canadian CBC Radio Competition
1985 Andrés Segovia International Guitar Competition (the first North American to do so)
Gramophone Magazine "Critic's Choice for 1989" 
Classic CD Magazine "Favourite CD of the Year"

See also
Canadian classical music
The Royal Conservatory of Music

References

External links
Article at the Canadian Encyclopedia
Some photos of LP covers (Oviatt Library Digital Collections)
Naxos Recordings
Naxos Guitar Collection
Naxos Recording Sessions - Videos
The Bach recordings (2011) - Norbert Kraft recording Ricardo Gallén

1950 births
Canadian classical guitarists
Canadian male guitarists
Living people
Manhattan School of Music faculty
Academic staff of The Royal Conservatory of Music